Daniel Gordon Raffan Cruickshank (born 26 August 1949) is a British art historian and BBC television presenter, with a special interest in the history of architecture.

Professional career
Cruickshank holds a BA in Art, Design and Architecture and was formerly a Visiting Professor in the Department of Architecture at the University of Sheffield and a member of the London faculty of the University of Delaware. He is an Honorary Fellow of the Royal Institute of British Artists, a member of the Executive Committee of the Georgian Group and on the Architectural Panel of the National Trust, and is an Honorary Fellow of RIBA.

He has served as Historic Buildings Consultant for ADAM Architecture since 1999 and has been involved in the repair and restoration of many historical buildings including Spencer House in St James's, Heveningham Hall in Suffolk and numerous early 18th-century houses in Spitalfields and other parts of London.

In 2014, he was appointed President of Subterranea Britannica, a UK-based society for all those interested in man-made and man-used underground structures and space.

His professional publications include London: the Art of Georgian Building (1975), The National Trust and Irish Georgian Society Guide to the Georgian Buildings of Britain and Ireland (1985) and Life in the Georgian City (1990). 

He edited the 20th edition of Sir Banister Fletcher's History of Architecture and Timeless Architecture: a study of key buildings in architectural history and is a contributing editor to Architects' Journal, The Architectural Review and Perspectives on Architecture.

Television work

Cruickshank began his career with the BBC as consultant, writer and presenter on the architectural programmes One Foot in the Past and The House Detectives. He also contributed films to the Timewatch  and Omnibus strands.

In 2001 he wrote and presented the series Invasion in which he examined attempts and plans to invade Britain and Ireland over the years by exploring coastal fortresses and defensive structures around the coast of the country to discover their military heritage.

Further series included Britain's Best Buildings examining architecturally – or culturally-significant buildings in Great Britain, Under Fire visiting museums and buildings in Afghanistan, Iraq and Israel to see how recent warfare has affected the country's historic artefacts, and What the Industrial Revolution Did for Us focusing on the scientific, technological and political changes of the 19th century.

In 2003, Cruickshank presented a documentary entitled Towering Ambitions: Dan Cruickshank at Ground Zero following the debate and discussion that led to the selection of Daniel Libeskind's design for the World Trade Center site in New York City; while in 2005 he presented a documentary on the Mitchell and Kenyon collection – rolls of nitrate film shot in the early 20th century, depicting everyday life in Britain, which were discovered in 1994 in Blackburn.

In 2004, Cruickshank was at the centre of a controversy when historian Marc Morris said that a documentary about Harlech Castle shown on BBC4 and billed as "written and presented by Dan Cruickshank" contained obvious borrowings from Morris's earlier Channel 4 series, Castle. The BBC subsequently stated that Cruickshank was not responsible and that it was an error by researchers. Channel 4's head of history programming, Hamish Mykura, commented that "When a programme claims to have an author's voice, it should be that author's voice and no one else's".  The BBC subsequently made a "goodwill payment" to Morris in recognition of the error.

In 2005, Cruickshank presented Around the World in 80 Treasures, charting his five-month trip around the world to visit eighty man-made artefacts or buildings that he had selected, in order to chart the history of mankind's civilisation.

In 2006, Cruickshank presented Marvels of the Modern Age, a series focusing on the development of modernism in design, from Greek and Roman architecture, to Bauhaus and the present.

Dan Cruickshank's Adventures in Architecture, a 2008 series in which he travelled around the world visiting what he considered to be the world's most unusual and interesting buildings.

In 2010, he embarked on a 3 part series on the history of the railways in Britain for National Geographic TV channel, including visits to Chester to examine the events surrounding the Dee bridge disaster of 1847, and Manchester for the Liverpool and Manchester Railway which opened in 1830. The series was entitled "Great Railway Adventures" and first appeared on UK television in the spring of 2010. In 2014, he appeared in The Life of Rock with Brian Pern as himself.

Personal life
Cruickshank lives in a Georgian house in Spitalfields, London, which he shares with his partner, the painter Marenka Gabeler, their son, and his daughter from a previous marriage. The house was among those he featured when presenting the BBC television programme Ours to Keep – Incomers in 1985, when he discussed the role of the Spitalfields Historic Buildings Trust, a charity of which he was a co-founder in the 1970s.

Cruickshank had previously lived in a Victorian house in Bloomsbury when he was a student in the 1970s.

Filmography
1985 Ours to Keep - Incomers  guest presenter
1993 One Foot in the Past guest presenter
1997–2002 The House Detectives presenter
1997 Travels with Pevsner: Norfolk with Dan Cruickshank writer and presenter
2001 Timewatch writer and presenter
2001 Invasion writer and presenter
2002 Omnibus: Dan Cruickshank and the Lost Treasure of Kabul writer and presenter
2002 The Lost World of Tyntesfield writer and presenter
2002 Britain's Best Buildings writer and presenter
2003 Under Fire writer and presenter
2003 Towering Ambitions: Dan Cruickshank at Ground Zero writer and presenter
2003 What the Industrial Revolution Did for Us writer and presenter
2005 Around the World in 80 Treasures writer and presenter
2005 The Lost World of Mitchell & Kenyon presenter
2005 Egyptian Journeys with Dan Cruickshank writer and presenter
2006 The Lost World of Friese-Greene
2006 Betjeman & Me presenter
2006 Marvels of the Modern Age writer and presenter
2006 The Lost World of Tibet presenter
2006 Britain's Best Buildings writer and presenter
2008 Dan Cruickshank's Adventures in Architecture writer and presenter
2009 Cruickshank on Kew The Garden That Changed The World writer and presenter
2009 The Art of Dying writer and presenter
2010 Great Railway Adventures writer and presenter
2010 Britain's Park Story writer and presenter
2011 The Country House Revealed writer and presenter
2012 Brick by Brick: Rebuilding Our Past presenter along with Charlie Luxton
2012 The Bridges That Built London
2012 London: A Tale of Two Cities with Dan Cruickshank
2013 The Fairytale Castles of King Ludwig II with Dan Cruickshank writer and presenter
2014 The Life of Rock with Brian Pern as himself
2014 Majesty and Mortar: Britain's Great Palaces writer and presenter
2014 Dan Cruickshank and the Family That Built Gothic Britain
2015 Dan Cruickshank's Civilisation Under Attack
2015 Dan Cruickshank: Resurrecting History – Warsaw
2016 Dan Cruickshank: At Home with the British
2018 The Road To Palmyra (with Don McCullin)
2018 Dan Cruickshank's Monuments of Remembrance

Bibliography
 
 
 
 
 
 
 
 
 
 
 
 
 
 
 
  (Also released under the title London's Sinful Secret by St. Martin's Press in New York in the same year)

References

External links
 
 Cruickshank's comments on visiting Iraq, post-U.S. invasion (BBC)
 Cruickshank's article on visiting Jam minaret in Afghanistan (The Guardian)
 Britain's Best Buildings (BBC)
 What The Industrial Revolution Did For Us (Open University)
 The Lost World of Friese-Greene on the BBC
 
 Dan Cruickshank Book List and Interview
 Dan Cruickshank reflects on his student flat in Bloomsbury

British art historians
British television presenters
Academics of the University of Sheffield
1949 births
Place of birth missing (living people)
Living people
British architectural historians
Architects from London
New Classical architects